Michele Rocca (born 6 February 1996) is an Italian footballer who plays as a midfielder for  club Novara.

Club career
Born in Milan, Lombardy, Rocca is a youth product of F.C. Internazionale Milano. He was a member of their under-16 side playing in the Allievi B league. Rocca was signed by Serie B club Novara on a temporary deal on 22 August 2012. He represented their under-17 team in the Allievi Nazionali (Serie A and Serie B) league. The loan was renewed on 9 August 2013. Rocca returned to play for Inter's Primavera side in the 2014–15 Campionato Nazionale Primavera season.

Sampdoria
On 31 August 2015, he was signed by fellow Serie A club Sampdoria for a €400,000 fee. Rocca was afforded the number 92 shirt by Sampdoria. On 28 September 2015, he made his Serie A debut in a 2–1 away defeat to Atalanta at Stadio Atleti Azzurri d'Italia. Rocca was one of twelve players included on the bench for Sampdoria when they faced Milan in the Round of 16 of the Coppa Italia on 17 December 2015.

Virtus Lanciano (loan)
On 1 February 2016, Sampdoria announced that Rocca had signed a short-term loan with Serie B outfit Virtus Lanciano. His first start for I Frentani came five days later in a 0−2 away victory at Vicenza in the league; of which he played 62 minutes before being replaced by midfielder Manuel Giandonato. Rocca received the first yellow card of his senior club career in a 2–0 away league loss to Spezia on 20 February 2016. His 18th appearance for the club came in their 1−4 home defeat by Salernitana in the 2015–16 Serie B Relegation Play-out first-leg. Rocca was included in the starting lineup for the return leg on 8 June at Stadio Arechi in which Salernitana won by a single goal scored by striker Massimo Coda (with the game finishing 5–1 on aggregate to the home side) thus relegating Virtus Lanciano to Lega Pro.

Latina (loan)
In July 2016, Serie B side Latina announced that they had signed both Rocca and Gabriele Rolando from Sampdoria on loan, with an option to purchase the pair on permanent deals at the end of the season. He was assigned the number 29 shirt, the reverse to his squad number 92 at Sampdoria. Latina then gave him the number 8 jersey to wear for the rest of the 2016–17 season (after Luigi Scaglia left the club).

Pro Vercelli (loan)
On 31 August 2017, Rocca joined Serie B side Pro Vercelli on a year-long loan. On 16 September, he made his debut for Pro Vercelli as a substitute, replacing Umberto Germano in the 71st minute of a 0–0 away draw with Brescia. After managing just three appearances, his loan was cancelled and the player returned to his parent club.

FeralpiSalò (loan)
On 19 January 2018, Rocca was signed by Serie C side FeralpiSalò on a six-month loan deal. On 20 January, he made his Serie C debut for FeralpiSalò in a 1–0 home win over Sambenedettese, he was replaced by Luca Parodi in the 56th minute. On 25 March, he scored his first professional goal, as a substitute, in the 31st minute of a 1–1 away draw with Fermana. On 29 April, he scored his second goal, again as a substitute, in the 90th minute of a 4–1 home win over Triestina. Rocca ended his loan spell at FeralpiSalò with 13 appearances and 2 goals.

Livorno (loan)
On 13 July 2018, Rocca joined newly-promoted Livorno on a two-season loan. He was handed his debut for Livorno on 5 August 2018, in the second round of the Coppa Italia, against Casertana. The match ended as a 1–1 draw and would eventually be decided on penalties after it remained one apiece following extra time. Livorno would go on to claim a  7–6 victory in the shoot-out to send them through to the next round. On 2 September, Rocca made his league debut for Livorno in Gameweek 2 of the Serie B season, as a starter, in an away visit to 
Pescara. Livorno would go on to lose the match 1–2.

Foggia
On 16 October 2020, he joined Serie C club Foggia.

Return to Novara
On 18 July 2022, Rocca returned to Novara, where he played on junior levels, with a two-year contract.

References

External links
 Profile at Sampdoria 
 
 Lega Serie A Profile 
 Lega Serie B Profile 
 News 1 febbraio: Ripresa al Memmo agli ordini di Maragliulo 

1996 births
Living people
Footballers from Milan
Italian footballers
Association football midfielders
Serie A players
Serie B players
Serie C players
Inter Milan players
U.C. Sampdoria players
S.S. Virtus Lanciano 1924 players
Latina Calcio 1932 players
F.C. Pro Vercelli 1892 players
FeralpiSalò players
U.S. Livorno 1915 players
Calcio Foggia 1920 players
Novara F.C. players
Italy youth international footballers